Campbellville is a compact rural community in the geographic township of Nassagaweya in the Town of Milton, Regional Municipality of Halton, Ontario, Canada. It is on the Niagara Escarpment and is a tourist destination for residents of the Greater Toronto Area.

History
Campbellville is named for John Campbell, who settled there in 1832.  A saw mill was later built.  A tavern was opened in 1847 by Mr. Priest.  A hotel was also located in the early settlement, which burned down around 1930.  The first store and post office were noted in 1849, located in William Campbell's home and operated by Malcolm Campbell.

Campbelleville was incorporated as a police village in 1914.

Campbellville was originally part of Nassagaweya Township, and it was noted in 1932 that Campbellville "was, as it is now, the most important centre" in the township.  Nassagaweya Township was part of Halton County until 1974, when the Regional Municipality of Halton was created and the township became part of the town of Milton.

Arts and culture
Located in Campbellville are Mohawk Racetrack, a harness racing venue; Crawford Lake Conservation Area, Mennonite furniture shops, an ice cream parlour, and Cristello's Village Market. The world's largest antique leaded stained glass store and museum, The Stonehouse of Campbellville, is also located in Campbellville.

Churches include St. David's Presbyterian Church, founded in 1869. Its current building dates to 1891 with an addition built in 1999. St. David's cemetery dates back to 1908.

The Serbian Orthodox Eparchy of Canada has its episcopal headquarters in Campbellville.

Education
 Hitherfield School
 Brookville Public School
 Hitherfield School, a private co-educational day school

Notable people
Joel "deadmau5" Zimmerman, progressive music DJ and producer
Charles Clarence "Clare" Laking (February 21, 1899 – November 26, 2005), believed to be the longest lived World War I veteran in Canada who fought on the front lines.
Grand Duchess Olga Alexandrovna of Russia (13 June [O.S. 1 June] 1882 – 24 November 1960), escaped to Canada after World War II and settled in the area before moving to Cooksville.
Bruce Hood (March 14, 1936 – January 5, 2018), NHL Referee, travel industry professional and politician.
Ronald Roberts (June 1, 1925 – July 4, 2012), WHA and NHL executive and insurance industry executive

See also

 Rattlesnake Point
 Conservation Halton
 Glen Eden (Ski Area)
 Kelso Conservation Area
 Halton County Radial Railway Museum
 Hilton Falls Conservation Area
 List of unincorporated communities in Ontario

References

Neighbourhoods in Milton, Ontario
Niagara Escarpment